The 2015–16 Slovenian Third League began on 22 August 2015 and ended on 29 May 2016 with playoffs being played on 4 and 8 June 2016.

Competition format and rules
The 2015–16 Slovenian Third League was divided into four regional groups with a total of 52 participating clubs. Three groups (i.e. North, Centre, East) were composed of 14 clubs, while the group West only had 10 clubs that were participating in the competition. The winners of the regular season in each group played a promotional two-legged play-offs to decide which two teams promoted to the Slovenian Second League. Reserve teams of the top division sides were ineligible to promote to the second division, due to the rules of the Football Association of Slovenia, which stipulated that one club's main squad and their reserve team must be at least two leagues apart in the country's football pyramid. Consequently, in case one club's main squad would get relegated from the top division to the second division their reserve team would be automatically relegated from the third division.

The number of relegated teams from each group was determined by the number of regional MNZ's from which the clubs in all four groups were a part of.

MNZ Celje (North)
MNZ Maribor (North)
MNZ Ptuj (North)

MNZG-Kranj (Centre)
MNZ Ljubljana (Centre)

MNZ Lendava (East)
MNZ Murska Sobota (East)

MNZ Koper (West)
MNZ Nova Gorica (West)

This meant that three teams from 3. SNL North were relegated at the end of the season and replaced by the winners of the fourth tier competitions held separately in MNZ Celje, MNZ Maribor and MNZ Ptuj. The number of relegated teams from 3. SNL Centre and 3. SNL East was two, while only the bottom team was relegated from 3. SNL West as MNZ Koper and MNZ Nova Gorica managed a combined fourth tier competition. The number of relegated teams was also determined by the location of teams which relegated from the second division.

3. SNL Centre

Clubs

League table

3. SNL East

Clubs

League table

3. SNL North

Clubs

League table

3. SNL West

Clubs

League table

Play-offs 
A two-legged play-offs between the group winners for promotion to the Slovenian Second League.

First leg

Second leg

Brda and Brežice 1919 were promoted to the Slovenian Second League.

See also
2015–16 Slovenian PrvaLiga
2015–16 Slovenian Second League

External links
Football Association of Slovenia 
MNZG-Kranj 
MNZ Murska Sobota 
MNZ Maribor 
MNZ Nova Gorica

References

3
Slovenian Third League, 2015-16
Slovenian Third League seasons